is the sixteenth single by B'z, released on May 31, 1995. This song is one of B'z many number-one singles in Oricon chart. It sold over 1,498,000 copies according to Oricon.

A re-recorded version of the song appears on the album Loose. It differs from the single version in that it has an extended piano intro, a longer guitar solo and a new, more abrupt ending.

Track listing 

You & I

Certifications

References

External links
B'z official website

1995 songs
B'z songs
Oricon Weekly number-one singles
Songs written by Tak Matsumoto
Songs written by Koshi Inaba
1995 singles